The 1963–64 Coppa Italia, the 17th Coppa Italia was an Italian Football Federation domestic cup competition won by Roma.

First round 

* Alessandria qualify after drawing of lots.

Intermediate round

Second round 

p=after penalty shoot-out

Third round 

p=after penalty shoot-out

Quarter-finals 
Milan, Atalanta, Juventus and Internazionale are added.

Semi-finals

p=after penalty shoot-out

Final

Note: expiring the term limit for the UEFA competitions, the FIGC made a bet over Torino, which would have played the replay at home, and qualified the club for the Cupwinners Cup, while qualified Roma for the Fairs Cup as compensation. By the way, the FIGC lost the bet.

Replay Final

Top goalscorers

References

rsssf.com

Coppa Italia seasons
Coppa Italia, 1963-64
1963–64 domestic association football cups